The Royal Society of St George is an English patriotic society established in 1894 to encourage interest in the English way of life, and English customs and traditions.

History
In 1415 St. George became the Patron Saint of England after the English soldiers fighting under the command of King Henry V had beaten the French at the Battle of Agincourt. Ever since then, St George has been the patriotic rallying point for the English people.

The Royal Society of St. George was founded in 1894 with the noble object of promoting "Englishness" and the English way of life. Howard Ruff was the founder in 1894 and the first Honorary Secretary of the Royal Society of St. George. In 1900 he gave up farming to devote his time exclusively to the Society. 

The Society quickly attracted the support of many distinguished public figures in England and throughout the then British Empire. Its first Royal Patron was Queen Victoria; and the society has enjoyed the Patronage of every reigning monarch from that day to this.

In 1963 the Queen granted the Society its own Royal Charter.
The Society was further granted Arms in 1990.

Before the formation of The Royal Society of St. George, Societies of St. George had been founded in the then North American Colonies for the relief of British immigrants and to give them general assistance in the new country. The earliest Branches of which there are any records are those of New York (1770), Philadelphia (1772) and Charlestown (1773). Subsequently Branches were formed in all the great cities of the North American continent and celebrations were always held on St. George's Day. At the time of the War of Independence many Loyalists moved to Canada and founded similar Societies in Halifax (1786) and other cities.

The Society's Objects
The Objects that are specified in the terms of its Royal Charter are:

To foster the love of England and to strengthen England and the Commonwealth by spreading the knowledge of English history, traditions, and ideals.
To keep fresh the memory of those in all walks of life, who have served England or the Commonwealth in the past, to inspire leadership in the future.
To combat all activities to undermine the strength of England or the Commonwealth.
To further English interest everywhere to ensure that St. George's Day is properly celebrated and to provide focal points all the world over where English men and women may gather together.

Charitable Causes
The Society has its own Charitable Trust, which is run separately from the Society and is governed by a Board of Trustees.

The objectives of the charity are to:
Help and encourage young people to greater achievement in England and the Commonwealth 
Encourage the enterprise, skills and enthusiasm of young people through support of appropriate organisations

Membership criteria
The Society is fully inclusive and independent of party politics and membership is open to all those who subscribe to the objects of the Society.

Their current membership is made up of a network of branches throughout England and the world, as well as a large number of direct Society members. The confraternity, the International Knightly Order Valiant of St George, is affiliated with the Society.

Former Presidents & Vice Presidents
The list below includes some of the notable people who have served as either President or Vice-President of the Society:
The Duke of Cambridge
The Prince of Wales (later Edward VIII then Duke of Windsor)
Field Marshal The Viscount Montgomery of Alamein
The Duke of Devonshire
Sir Winston Churchill  
Gerald Grosvenor, 6th Duke of Westminster  
Peter Nelson, 9th Earl Nelson
Charles Forte, Baron Forte Kt
Field Marshal Edwin Bramall, Baron Bramall

See also 

St. George Society of Philadelphia
The United Empire Loyalists' Association of Canada

References

External links

Saint George's Society New York (earliest branch)

1894 establishments in England
St George
Patriotic societies
Charities based in Essex
Organizations established in 1894